Fremont Municipal Airport  is two miles northwest of Fremont, in Dodge County, Nebraska. The FAA's National Plan of Integrated Airport Systems for 2009-2013 classified it as a general aviation airport.

Facilities
It has one runway: 14/32 is 6,350 by 100 feet (1,676 x 30 m) asphalt/concrete.

In the year ending August 13, 2008 the airport had 22,300 aircraft operations, average 61 per day: 83% general aviation, 16% air taxi and 1% military. 50 aircraft were then based at the airport: 84% single-engine and 16% multi-engine.

References

External links 
 Aerial photo as of 4 April 1999 from USGS The National Map
 

Airports in Nebraska
Buildings and structures in Dodge County, Nebraska